Dekh Tamasha Dekh is a 2014 Indian Hindi-language social and political satire film about a true incident. It revolves around the search for the religious identity of a poor man crushed under the weight of a politician's hoarding. The film explores an Impossible India where bizarre is normal.

Plot
Inspired by a true incident, the film starts off when an underprivileged man gets crushed under the weight of a politician's (Satish Kaushik) poster. The film gets into the mood immediately after the man dies. The story gets into a climax as the judge tries to get into the details of the man's death, lawyers of parties argue the case and as it sparks communal riots. The deceased, who was a Hindu by birth, got converted to Islam. His death gives rise to a religious spark between the two religious factions who want his body to be burnt and buried, respectively.

Cast
Satish Kaushik as Muthaseth
Tanvi Azmi as Fatima
 Vinay Jain as Vishwasrao
Sharad Ponkshe as Bawderkar
Ganesh Yadav as Inspector Sawant
Santosh Juvekar as Badshah
Apoorva Arora as Shabbo
Alok Rajwade as Prashant
Satish Alekar as Professor Shastri
Jaywant Wadka as Sattar
Dhiresh Josh as Kulkarni 
Spruha Joshi as Rafiq's wife

Soundtrack

Reception
This Film got some average Reviews. Madhureeta Mukherjee from Times of India gave it 3 out of 5 stars and wrote, "The film often rolls out like a play or a social commentary with staged events (often over-stretched) that result in an abrupt narrative. The stark portrayal of bare-faced reality (devoid of background music) with a cast of commoners - gives it a docu-drama flavour. 'DTD' is 'grave' alright, but offers hilarity in decent doses." Subhash K. Jha of IANS gave it 4 out of 5, "By using the twin missiles of satire and irony, he brings into a play a kind of pinned-down provocativeness into the plot whereby the characters become real and representational simultaneously." and added,"To record the dirt on the wall and the blood on the floor with such clarity and honesty is not within the creative powers of every filmmaker." Shubhra Gupta of Indian Express, who gave 3 out of 5 stars, explained, "Khan's film gets into theatrical territory every once in a while, but there is no denying its terrifying power. He pulls no punches, and paints extremism from both sides equally black." and suggested, "This is an important film, and I do hope it gets seen widely, timely and topical as it is in the time of Muzzafarnagar, misguided mullahs and modified bhakts."

Awards and nominations

References

External links
 

2010s Hindi-language films
Indian political satire films
Indian films based on actual events